San Lorenzo, New Mexico can refer to:

San Lorenzo, Grant County, New Mexico, an unincorporated community in Grant County
San Lorenzo, Rio Arriba County, New Mexico, an unincorporated community in Rio Arriba County
San Lorenzo, Socorro County, New Mexico, an unincorporated community in Socorro County